WPAN (channel 53) is a television station licensed to Fort Walton Beach, Florida, United States, and also serving Pensacola. Its main channel primarily airs programming from Blab TV, a locally based channel that produces local infomercials and paid programming. Owned by B&C Communications, WPAN maintains transmitter facilities near Molino, Florida.

History
The Fort Walton Beach Broadcasting Company applied in 1982 for a new television station on channel 53 to serve that city, a plan that had been gestating since 1980. Construction began in 1983, with the station to be based at a site near Tupelo Avenue and 4th Street in Fort Walton Beach.

WPAN intended to sign on in December 1983, but tower completion delays pushed the launch into 1984. The new station, which went on air on February 14, represented a $4 million investment. Programs telecast included family-oriented syndicated shows, movies, and sports. However, Fort Walton Beach could not operate the station from a financial standpoint, and it closed at midnight on November 16, 1986; one minority partner noted they simply could not sell enough advertising.

Channel 53 returned to the air on July 1, 1988, under the aegis of Franklin Broadcasting. The station's new programming included more religious fare. It operated only sporadically, and at one point, it was affiliated with the short-lived Star Television Network. By 1991, it was partially simulcasting WJTC in Pensacola in an agreement primarily conceived to allow some of that station's programs to be seen on cable systems otherwise unable to carry it. However, it would be dark for a full two years from 1991 to 1993. In 1993, the revival of must-carry legislation pushing channel 53 into more cable homes led to Franklin reviving WPAN, as did a contract with BLAB-TV (an acronym for "Basic Local Area Broadcasting"). BLAB, which produced local infomercials and sponsored segments for local businesses that aired on cable, purchased 37 hours a week of airtime on WPAN starting November 1; remaining hours were filled by ValueVision and Video Catalog, home shopping services.

Several attempts were made by Franklin over the years to sell the station, and it was silent for much of 2013 and 2014 pending sale. Neal Ardman was listed as managing the station in early 2013, when it began to air Cozi TV. It returned in 2014 with programming from the Soul of the South Network. From May 2015 to May 2016, WPAN was off the air under special temporary authority to be silent, as Franklin could not pay the electricity bill and had been placed into receivership; on May 16, WPAN returned to the air under new owners B&C Communications as an affiliate of the Vibrant TV Network, and then in February 2019, after the Vibrant TV network ceased operations, it switched to carrying Antenna TV.

WPAN went off the air in October 2019 due to a dispute with the tower owner, who expected the debt from the prior owners to be repaid in order to gain access to the transmitter. Since the station needed to move to channel 21 as part of the FCC repack, it opted to construct a new tower in Molino to offer market-wide coverage for the first time. WPAN returned to the airwaves in October 2020 after filing for another silent STA due to the tower situation. BLAB also returned to channel 53.

Technical information

Subchannels
The station's digital signal is multiplexed:

Former translator
The station formerly operated a repeater, W50CF, in Mobile, Alabama, which broadcast on analog channel 50 (and prior to that was W69AU channel 69). The translator was sold to Word of Life Community Church in Chickasaw, Alabama, before going off the air for good to make way for the digital signal of WFGX.

References

External links 

PAN
Television channels and stations established in 1984
1984 establishments in Florida
Tri-State Christian Television affiliates